Colesevelam is a bile acid sequestrant administered orally. It was developed by GelTex Pharmaceuticals and later acquired by Genzyme.  It is marketed in the U.S. by Daiichi Sankyo under the brand name Welchol and elsewhere by Genzyme as Cholestagel.  In Canada it is marketed by Valeant as Lodalis.

Clinical use
Colesevelam is indicated as an adjunct to diet and exercise to reduce elevated low-density lipoprotein cholesterol (LDL-C) in patients with primary hyperlipidemia as monotherapy and to improve glycemic control in adults with type 2 diabetes mellitus, including in combination with a statin.  The expanded use of colesevelam in adults with type 2 diabetes mellitus is an example of drug repositioning.

Colesevelam is one of the bile-acid sequestrants, which along with niacin and the statins, are the three main types of cholesterol-lowering agents. The statins are considered the first-line agents. This is because of the larger body of evidence supporting statins' ability to prevent cardiovascular disease, as well as the prominent side effects from the other two types, including bloating and constipation (bile-acid sequestrants) and skin flushing (niacin). These side effects often lead to low patient compliance.

Colesevelam can be used instead of cholestyramine in symptomatic chronic diarrhea due to bile salt malabsorption (bile acid diarrhea), which can be a primary condition, or secondary to Crohn's disease or the postcholecystectomy syndrome.

Constituents
Colesevelam is a modified polyallylamine.  It is made by crosslinking polyallylamine with epichlorohydrin, and then modifying it with bromodecane and (6-bromohexyl)trimethylammonium bromide.  The bromide ions are then replaced with chloride ions when the material is washed.

The constituents of the polymer colesevelam shown as subunits that do not exist per se in the final product are:

N-prop-2-enyldecan-1-amine; trimethyl-[6-(prop-2-enylamino)hexyl]azanium; prop-2-en-1-amine; 2-(chloromethyl)oxirane; hydrogen chloride; chloride.

Mechanism of action
Colesevelam is part of a class of drugs known as bile acid sequestrants. Colesevelam hydrochloride, the active pharmaceutical ingredient in Welchol, is a non-absorbed, lipid-lowering polymer that binds bile acids in the intestine, impeding their reabsorption. As the bile acid pool becomes depleted, the hepatic enzyme, cholesterol 7-α-hydroxylase, is upregulated, which increases the conversion of cholesterol to bile acids. This causes an increased demand for cholesterol in the liver cells, resulting in the dual effect of increasing transcription and activity of the cholesterol biosynthetic enzyme, HMG-CoA reductase, and increasing the number of hepatic LDL receptors. These compensatory effects result in increased clearance of LDL-C from the blood, resulting in decreased serum LDL-C levels. Serum TG levels may increase or remain unchanged.

It is not yet known how Colesevelam works to help control blood sugar in people with type 2 diabetes. However, it is clear that the drug works within the digestive tract, since it is not absorbed into the rest of the body.

Cholesterol
Since Colesevelam can lower total and LDL cholesterol levels (along with raising HDL), taking it may decrease one's risk of developing certain health problems in the future.

Previous clinical research studies indicate individuals taking 3,800 mg to 4,500 mg of Colesevelam daily were able to:
 Reduce LDL cholesterol by 15 to 18 percent.
 Reduce total cholesterol by 7 to 10 percent.
 Raise HDL cholesterol by 3 percent.

The combination of Colesevelam with a HMG-CoA reductase inhibitor (known more commonly as a statin) can further lower cholesterol levels.

Side effects 
In controlled clinical studies involving approximately 1,400 patients, the following adverse reactions have been reported in patients treated with colesevelam. When reporting to the very common (≥ 1 / 10), common (≥ 1 / 100, 51/10), uncommon (≥ 1 / 1000, 51/100), rare (≥ 1/10.000, 51/1000) and distinction very rarely (51/10.000), including individual cases:
 Investigations Common: serum triglyceride increased; Uncommon: serum transaminase increases
 Nervous system disorders Common: headache
 Gastrointestinal disorders Very Common: flatulence, constipation; Common: vomiting, diarrhea, dyspepsia, abdominal pain, stool abnormalities, nausea
 Musculoskeletal and connective tissue disorders Uncommon: myalgia
The background incidence of flatulence and diarrhea was the same in patients in controlled clinical trials, and higher in the placebo group. Only constipation and dyspepsia were shown to occur in a higher percentage of patients who received Cholestagel, compared to the placebo group. Side effects were generally mild or moderate in severity.  In the application of colesevelam in combination with statins, no unexpected frequent side effects occurred.

References

External links
 

Hepatology
Bile acid sequestrants
Daiichi Sankyo